In ancient Greek and Roman legendary history, Marpesia (Greek: Μαρπησία "Snatcher"; sometimes wrongly spelled Marthesia) was Queen of the Amazons with Lampedo ("burning torch"), her sister, as a co-ruler. They ruled with Hippo ("horse") after the death of Lysippe.

Marpesia was one of the rulers who helped establish the Greek city of Ephesus. She also established a city in the Caucasus Mountains referred to as the Rock of Marpesia or the Marpesian Cliff. Alexander the Great sometime later built gates there which were called the Caspian Gates. This was an area on the Thermodon River in Cappadocia. Marpesia and Lampedo extended the Amazon influence to Europe and greater Asia Minor, becoming an object of terror to that part of the world.

Marpesia was succeeded by her daughters Orithyia and Antiope (some sources add Synope) after she was killed in battle during a sudden invasion by Asian barbarians.

In Giovanni Boccaccio’s Famous Women, a chapter is dedicated to Lampedo and Marpesia.

References

Bibliography 
Justinus Epitoma Historiarum philippicarum Pompei Trogi II.4.1-16
Orosius Historiae adversus paganos I.15.1-6
Giovanni Boccaccio’s Famous Women translated by Virginia Brown 2001, p. 25-27; Cambridge and London, Harvard University Press; 

Queens of the Amazons